Counselor or counsellor may refer to:

A professional

In diplomacy and  government 

 Counsellor of State, senior member of the British royal family to whom the Monarch can delegate some functions in case of unavailability
 Counselor (diplomat), a high-ranking diplomat
 Counselor of the United States Department of State, confidential adviser to the U.S. Secretary of State
 Navy Counselor in the United States Navy
 State Counsellor of Myanmar, former de facto head of government of Myanmar

In education and social work 

 Camp counselor, or "cabin leader", adult supervisor in summer camps
 Counselor-in-Training, training program for camp counselors
 School counselor, also "guidance counselor" or "educational counselor"

Elsewhere 

 Credit counseling professional help in the US, "debt counsellor" in the UK
 Counselor at law, used interchangeably with "lawyer"
 Counsel, lawyer in certain jurisdictions
 Mental health counselor
 Licensed professional counselor
 Grief counselor

Other 

 Counselor (role variant), a Myers-Briggs Type Indicator personality type
 Counselor, a magazine published by the Advertising Specialty Institute
 "Counselor", a song by In Fear and Faith from the album, Imperial
 Institution of the Counsellors, an appointed office in the Bahá'í Administrative Order
 "Marriage Guidance Counsellor", a Monty Python sketch
 The Counselor, a 2013 American crime thriller film

ja:カウンセラー